The word Hamburgevons (or Hamburgefonstiv or Hamburgefons) is a short piece of meaningless filler text used for assessing the design and the appearance of a typeface. It contains all essential forms in a Latin alphabet, so that the character of the respective font can be recognized quickly. It consists of the letters that are often first designed when designing a typeface.

The word is useful for typographers and designers during the design of a font, as the form of its letters include all of the curves and abutments normally found in a font. As a test word, it is useful for determining the visual readability of a font chosen for a layout. A version of it is often used as a standard word in the visual layout of fonts submitted to competitions and exhibitions.

See also

Bibliography 
Jérôme Peignot, L’Alphabet des lettres, ou le petit hamburgefons, Paris, Imprimerie nationale, 1995, 128 p..

References 

Typography